is a Japanese football player who plays for JEF United Chiba.

His elder brother Koki is also a professional footballer currently playing for the J2 League Giravanz Kitakyushu. 
His father Yahiro is a former professional footballer, and currently a manager of the J1 League team Kawasaki Frontale.

Club statistics
Updated to the end of the 2018 season.

References

External links
Profile at FC Gifu

1993 births
Living people
Association football people from Hiroshima Prefecture
Japanese footballers
J1 League players
J2 League players
Kawasaki Frontale players
Oita Trinita players
FC Gifu players
FC Ryukyu players
Association football midfielders